{{DISPLAYTITLE:Vitamin B4}}
Vitamin B4 is a former designation given to several distinct chemical compounds, none of which is currently considered a true vitamin:

 Adenine
 Carnitine
 Choline